Look Who's Barking is the title of at least two television episodes:
 "Look Who's Barking" (Charmed), an episode of the television series Charmed
"Look Who's Barking", from season five of the television series Married... with Children